Yagan Sasman (born 10 July 1996) is a South African footballer who plays as a defender for the Swallows in the South African Premier Division.

Career

Ajax Cape Town
A product of the club's youth academy, Sasman made his league debut for the club on 4 March 2017, playing the entirety of a 0-0 draw with SuperSport United.

References

External links
Yagan Sasman at Kaizer Chiefs Official Website

1996 births
Living people
Cape Town Spurs F.C. players
Kaizer Chiefs F.C. players
South African Premier Division players
National First Division players
South African soccer players
Association football defenders